Trichacorynus is a genus of true weevils in the beetle family Curculionidae. There are at least three described species in Trichacorynus.

Species
These three species belong to the genus Trichacorynus:
 Trichacorynus brunneus Blatchley, 1916
 Trichacorynus protractus (Horn, 1873)
 Trichacorynus sulcirostris Blatchley, 1928

References

Further reading

 
 
 

Cossoninae
Articles created by Qbugbot